Jahanabad-e Olya (also Romanized as Jahānābād-e ‘Olyā; also known as Jahānābād-e Bālā) is a village in Qoroq Rural District, Baharan District, Gorgan County, Golestan Province, Iran. At the 2006 census, its population was 220, in 51 families.

References 

Populated places in Gorgan County